The Marañón dry forests (NT0223) is an ecoregion in northern Peru. 
It covers the lower valley of the Marañón River and its tributaries along the eastern edge of the Andes. 
It has a dry climate due to rain shadow from mountains further east.
The habitat has long been modified by farming, ranching and logging and is now threatened by construction of hydroelectric and irrigation dams.

Location
It extends along the upper valley of the Marañón River and its tributaries.
To the north the ecoregion adjoins the Eastern Cordillera Real montane forests.
The northern part of the ecoregion extends from the Tumbes–Piura dry forests in the west to the Ucayali moist forests in the east.
The ecoregion extends to the southeast through the Peruvian Yungas and patches of the Cordillera Central páramo.

Physical

The Marañón River rises on the Nevado de Yapura glacier, and runs northwest through northern Peru between the western and eastern cordilleras of the Andes.
It then turns northeast, breaks through the mountains and flows into the Amazon lowlands, where it meets the Ucayali River and forms the Amazon River.

The ecoregion's most southern part is in the Tayabamba District to the west of the Rio Abiseo National Park.
It extends downstream along the river valley in a northwest direction to the region south of Jaén where it is joined by the Chamaya River and turns to the northeast.
It includes the valley of the Chotano River, which flows northwest parallel to and west of the Marañó.
The Chotano  joins the Huancabamba River to form the Chamaya below Pucará.
The Chamaya flows northeast to join the Marañó.
Beyond Jaén the ecoregion extends along the southeast bank of the Marañó, and includes the valleys of the Utcubamba and Chiriaco rivers, which enter the Marañó from the southeast, and the eastern part of Cordillera de Colán National Sanctuary in the Chiriaco valley.

Climate

The ecoregion has a dry climate caused by the rain shadow from the mountains to the east.
The Köppen climate classification is "Cfb": warm temperate; fully humid; warm summer.
The valleys of the Utcubamba, Chamaya and Maranon rivers have similar climates.

Ecology

The Marañón dry forests ecoregion is in the neotropical realm, in the tropical and subtropical dry broadleaf forests biome.
The ecoregion is part of the  Tumbesian-Andean Valleys Dry Forests global ecoregion, which holds six terrestrial ecoregions: Tumbes–Piura dry forests, Ecuadorian dry forests, Patía Valley dry forests, Magdalena Valley dry forests, Cauca Valley dry forests and Marañón dry forests. 
The fauna and flora of the global ecoregion have high levels of endemism.

Flora

The ecoregion holds seasonally dry tropical deciduous forest and arid or riparian scrub.
Botanically it is the richest of the inter-Andean valleys, with 184 woody plant species.
Characteristic species include Acacia macracantha, Athyana weinntanniifolia, Ceiba insignis, Cordia iguaguana, Cyathostegia mathewsii, Eriotheca discolor, Eriotheca peruviana, Geoffroea spinosa, Hura crepitans, Krameria lappacea, Llagunoa nitida, Parkinsonia praecox, Praecereus euchlorus and Rauhocereus riosaniensis.
69 species are endemic to Peru and many are found only in small, isolated areas.
These include Browningia riosaniensis, Praecereus euchlorus, Coursetia cajamarcana and Coursetia maraniona.
Recently described species include Parkinsonia peruviana, Ruprechtia aperta and Ruprechtia albida, as well as the new genus Maraniona.

Fauna

Endangered amphibians include the painted frog (Atelopus pachydermus).
There is a high level of endemism among birds, with 22 species of  restricted-range, of which 11 are endemic.
Endangered birds include the yellow-bellied seedeater (Sporophila nigricollis) and Marañón spinetail (Synallaxis maranonica).

Status

The area has long been affected by agriculture, cattle ranching and logging.
Plans to build a series of 20 hydroelectric and/or irrigation dams on the Marañón River were announced by President Alan García in April 2011.
18 of the dams would be in environmentally sensitive areas, include the dry forests, and would displace indigenous people and other farmers and fishermen along the river.

Notes

Sources

Neotropical dry broadleaf forests
Ecoregions of Peru